Dimitris Psathas (1907 – 13 November 1979) was a modern Greek satirist and playwright. He was born in Trabzon of Pontos, then part of the Ottoman Empire, in 1907. 

He went to Athens in 1923 and finished his studies whereby he devoted himself to both journalism and the theatre. In 1937, his first book was published Justice is in a good mood, followed the next year by Justice is in a bad mood. He became known with his book Madam Sousou. He wrote many successful theatrical plays. Christos Alexiou describes his theatrical work as "polite comedies" which supplied "relief during the occupation and civil wars". He also wrote a 500-page historical chronicle about the resistance of his compatriots entitled Land of Pontos. As a journalist, he has been described as one of the country's principal columnists during the mid-1970s.

He died in Athens in 1979.

References

Further reading
Psathas, Dimitris (1907–1989), Encyclopedia of Modern Greek Literature, pp. 351–52 (2004)

External links 

1907 births
1979 deaths
Emigrants from the Ottoman Empire to Greece
Greek satirists
20th-century Greek historians
Greek writers
Greek journalists
Theatre in Greece
Greek dramatists and playwrights
Greek screenwriters
People from Trabzon
20th-century Greek dramatists and playwrights
20th-century screenwriters
20th-century journalists
Pontic Greeks